National Democratic Alliance (NDA) is an Indian political party coalition lead by Bharatiya Janata Party (BJP). Following is the Lok Sabha constituencies-wise list of the National Democratic Alliance candidates for the 2019 Indian general election..

BJP is one of the two major political parties in India; the other being the Indian National Congress. BJP has formed pre-poll alliance with various parties and independent candidates to constitute the National Democratic Alliance. Of the 29 states and 7 union territories, BJP will be having alliance in 11 states (Assam, Bihar, Jharkhand, Karnataka, Kerala, Maharashtra Nagaland, Punjab, Rajasthan, Tamil Nadu and Uttar Pradesh) and 1 union territory (Puducherry) with regional political parties. 

Together, NDA will be contesting for all 543 constituency seats that will form the 17th Lok Sabha. BJP will form the highest share of NDA by contesting in 437 constituencies; followed by other large parties like, AIADMK (20), JDU (17) and Shiromani Akali Dal (10)

Seat Sharing Summary

Andhra Pradesh

Arunachal Pradesh

Assam

Bihar

Chhattisgarh

Goa

Gujarat

Haryana

Himachal Pradesh

Jammu and Kashmir

Jharkhand

Karnataka

Kerala

Madhya Pradesh

Maharashtra 
2019 Indian general election Maharashtra

Manipur

Meghalaya 

Note: NDA member National People's Party won in Tura, although there was no pre-poll alliance.

Mizoram 

Note: NDA member Mizo National Front won, although there was no pre-poll alliance.

Nagaland

Odisha

Punjab

Rajasthan

Sikkim

Tamil Nadu

Telangana

Tripura

Uttar Pradesh

Uttarakhand

West Bengal

Andaman and Nicobar Islands

Chandigarh

Dadra and Nagar Haveli

Daman and Diu

Lakshadweep

NCT of Delhi

Puducherry

References

Candidates in the 2019 Indian general election
Lists of Indian political candidates